This is a list of Billboard magazine's Top Hot 100 songs of 1999.

See also
1999 in music
List of Billboard Hot 100 number-one singles of 1999
List of Billboard Hot 100 top-ten singles in 1999

References

1999 record charts
Billboard charts